Rt. Revd. Peter Yonetaro Matsui (松井 米太郎) D.D. (died October 16, 1946) was an Anglican bishop of the Diocese of Tokyo, in the Nippon Sei Ko Kai, the Province of the Anglican Communion in Japan.

Studied for two years at Wycliffe College, Toronto

President of Rikkyo University, Tokyo from October 1940 to January 1943.

Supported the controversial position of Bishop John Yasutaro Naide as the Nippon Sei Ko Kai debated its future direction and leadership during the late 1930s and early 1940s. Was replaced as Bishop of Tokyo by Paul Shinji Sasaki in January 1944.

See also
Anglican Church in Japan
Paul Shinji Sasaki

References

1946 deaths
Japanese Anglican bishops
Anglican Church in Japan
1869 births
Anglican bishops of Tokyo